The 1986 City of Lincoln Council election took place on 8 May 1986. This was on the same day as other local elections. One third of the council was up for election: the seats of which were last contested in 1982. The Labour Party retained control of the council.

Overall results

|-
| colspan=2 style="text-align: right; margin-right: 1em" | Total
| style="text-align: right;" | 12
| colspan=5 |
| style="text-align: right;" | 23,483
| style="text-align: right;" | 

All comparisons in vote share are to the corresponding 1982 election.

Ward results

Abbey

Birchwood

Boultham

Bracebridge

Carholme

Castle (2 seats)

Longdales

Minster

Moorland

Park

Tritton

References

1986
1986 English local elections
1980s in Lincolnshire